Calochortus invenustus is a species of flowering plant in the lily family known by the common name plain mariposa lily.

It is native to the mountain ranges of central and southern California, where it grows in the coniferous forests. It has also been found in the Bodie Hills in Mineral County, Nevada.

Description
Calochortus invenustus is a perennial herb which produces a slender, mostly unbranched stem up to 50 centimeters tall. There is a basal leaf 10 to 20 centimeters long which withers at flowering.

The inflorescence bears 1 to 6 erect bell-shaped flowers in a loose cluster. Each flower has three sepals and three petals which are usually white to light purple and may have spotting low at the base and greenish streaking on the outer surfaces.

The fruit is an angled capsule up to 7 centimeters long.

References

External links
United States Department of Agriculture Plants Profile
Calphotos Photo gallery, University of California
Wayne's Word Website, Photos Of Plants In The San Diego County Mountains #2 Photos of several species including C. invenustus, taken by W.P. Armstrong

invenustus
Flora of California
Flora of Nevada
Flora of the Sierra Nevada (United States)
Natural history of the California Coast Ranges
Natural history of the Peninsular Ranges
Natural history of the Transverse Ranges
Flora without expected TNC conservation status